

Boston, Massachusetts is home to many listings on the National Register of Historic Places. This list encompasses those locations that are located south of the Massachusetts Turnpike. See National Register of Historic Places listings in northern Boston for listings north of the Turnpike. Properties and districts located elsewhere in Suffolk County's other three municipalities are also listed separately.

There are 347 properties and districts listed on the National Register in Suffolk County, including 58 National Historic Landmarks. The southern part of the city of Boston is the location of 178 of these properties and districts, including 13 National Historic Landmarks. Two historic districts overlap into both northern and southern Boston: milestones that make up the 1767 Milestones are found in both areas, and the Olmsted Park System extends through much of the city.

Current listings

|}

See also 
 List of National Historic Landmarks in Massachusetts
 National Register of Historic Places listings in Massachusetts

References

Southern